Christopher  Cahill (born 25 December 1984) is a retired footballer. Born in Australia, he represented Samoa at International level.

Club career
Cahill was born on Christmas Day 1984 in Sydney, Australia to a father of Irish descent and a Samoan mother. Cahill played four games for Dulwich Hill FC in 2004. He then moved to St. George Saints, where he played from 2006 to 2012.

International career 
He played for Samoa national football team and was briefly national team captain.
He played in the 2010 FIFA World Cup Qualifiers, scoring twice against American Samoa. He did not appear at the 2012 OFC Nations Cup, which was Samoa's first appearance at a major tournament.

Personal life 
He is the brother of Australian international Tim Cahill, and cousin of Ben Roberts (New Zealand Kiwis), Joe Stanley (New Zealand All Blacks), and Jeremy Stanley (New Zealand All Blacks).

References

External links

1984 births
Living people
People with acquired Samoan citizenship
Samoan footballers
Association football midfielders
Samoa international footballers
Samoan people of Irish descent
Soccer players from Sydney
Australian soccer players
Australian people of Irish descent
Australian sportspeople of Samoan descent
Stanley family (rugby)